The sixth season of the Reborn! anime series is a compilation of episodes that broadcast episodes 141 to 153 from July 11, 2009 to October 3, 2009 on TV Tokyo. Titled as Katekyō Hitman Reborn! in Japan, the Japanese television series is directed by Kenichi Imaizumi, and produced and animated by Artland. The plot, based on the Reborn! manga by Akira Amano, follows Tsuna Sawada, the future boss of the infamous Vongola Mafia family, and his friends as they return to the past to complete the Arcobaleno trials. This season is titled Arcobaleno in the DVD release.

Two pieces of theme musics are used for the season: one openings and one ending theme.

Marvelous Entertainment released season six on three DVD compilations between February 26, 2010 and April 30, 2010. On March 21, 2009, Japan's d-rights production company collabor anime-streaming website called Crunchyroll in order to begin streaming subbed episodes of the Japanese-dubbed series worldwide. New episodes are available to everyone a week after its airing in Japan.

Episode list

Volume DVDs
Marvelous Entertainment released season six on three DVD compilations between February 26, 2010 and April 30, 2010.

References
General
 
 
 
Specific

External links
 Official Reborn! website 
 Official anime website 
 TV Tokyo's official anime website 

2009 Japanese television seasons
Season 6